Chai Po Wa (born 12 April 1966) or Qi Baohua is a table tennis player from Hong Kong. From 1989 to 1997 she won several medals in singles, doubles, and team events in the Asian Table Tennis Championships and in the World Table Tennis Championships. She also competed at the 1992 Summer Olympics and the 1996 Summer Olympics.

She is the sister of Qi Baoxiang, also a table tennis player.

References

1966 births
Hong Kong female table tennis players
Living people
Asian Games medalists in table tennis
Table tennis players at the 1990 Asian Games
Table tennis players at the 1994 Asian Games
Table tennis players from Baoding
Asian Games silver medalists for Hong Kong
Asian Games bronze medalists for Hong Kong
Medalists at the 1990 Asian Games
Medalists at the 1994 Asian Games
Olympic table tennis players of Hong Kong
Table tennis players at the 1992 Summer Olympics
Table tennis players at the 1996 Summer Olympics
20th-century Hong Kong women